Gijan (also Romanized as Gījān; also known as Kījān) is a village in Kuhestan Rural District, Kelardasht District, Chalus County, Mazandaran Province, Iran. At the 2006 census, its population was 91, in 24 families.

References 

Populated places in Chalus County